Aabha Paul (born 7 August 1987) is an Indian actress and model, who works in Hindi films. She is known for her role in Kamasutra 3D (2013), directed by Rupesh Paul, which was screened at the Cannes Film Festival in 2013. In 2019, she appeared in the ALT Balaji series Gandii Baat by Ekta Kapoor. Aabha also starred as Sarita Nair in an erotic drama Mastram which was released in 2020. She has also starred in other series such as XXX, Lolita P.G House, Namkeen and Hai Taubba. She has worked in music video of song "Dunalli".

Personal life 
Aabha Paul was born in 1987 in Ghaziabad , Uttar Pradesh, India.She studied from Shri Hans Inter College High School. Aabha has three siblings. She is a graduate in Bachelor of Arts.

Career 
Aabha Paul started her modelling career in 2005. In 2006, she won beauty pageant Miss Delhi award. In 2010, she had a small part in Veer, starring Slaman Khan, but her part was edited out.

In 2017, she appeared in Taste, a Tamil film. In 2020, she launched her app, and was downloaded by over one lakh users. In 2021, she acted as lead in Lolita PG House. In 2021, she appeared in Abhay Shukla's Namkeen. Later, she starred in the ALT Balaji series Hai Taubba. Aabha's performance in the series was lauded.

Filmography

Films

Web Series

References

External links 
 
 

1987 births
People from Ghaziabad, Uttar Pradesh
Indian actresses
Living people